National 2 might refer to:

 Curriculum for Excellence, Scottish education
 Championnat National 2, French football league